Lenjan County is in Isfahan province, Iran. The capital of the county is the city of Zarrin Shahr (Riz-e Lenjan). At the 2006 census, the county's population was 225,559 in 58,232 households. The following census in 2011 counted 246,510 people in 71,028 households. At the 2016 census, the county's population was 262,912 in 81,101 households.

Lenjan County is the location of Isfahan Steel Mill. It is located on the banks of the Zayandeh River, which the largest river in Isfahan Province. Farming is an important source of income, and the most important product in Lenjan is rice.

Hossein Rajaei Rizi is the representative of Lenjan in Islamic Consultative Assembly.

Administrative divisions

The population history and structural changes of Lenjan County's administrative divisions over three consecutive censuses are shown in the following table. The latest census shows two districts, five rural districts, and nine cities.

Transportation
The main route passing through the county is Road 51, connecting population centres to Isfahan and Shahrekord.

Lenjan County has its own Transit Bus system named Lenjan County Mass Transit Organization.

References

External links
 www.ppli.ir
 www.payampersa.ir
 www.lenjan.net

 

Counties of Isfahan Province